The Ngarnka, also Ngarnji or Ngewin, are an indigenous Australian people of the Northern Territory. They are often said to be the same as the Gudanji, one of whose alternative names is Ngarnji. However linguists distinguish between the language spoken by Ngarnka speakers and those who speak Gudanji.

Name and language
Ngarnka is classified as one of the non Pama Nyungan Mirndi languages. The last fluent speaker died in 1997/ 1998.

Many contemporary Ngarnka regard themselves and the Wambaya as essentially the same tribal grouping, with Wambaya used as an alternative name for themselves. Linguistic research by Neil Chadwick has clarified however that that Ngarnka down to recent times (the 1970s), though genetically affiliated with Wambaya and Jingulu, was a distinct language.

Alternative names
 Ngarnga
 Ngarndji
 Gudanji
 Ngewin
 Gnuin
 Leeillawarrie

Notes

Citations

Sources

Aboriginal peoples of the Northern Territory